Bad Boy's Da Band was an American hip hop group put together by Sean "P. Diddy" Combs and signed to P. Diddy's Bad Boy Records. The group's story was documented for three seasons of MTV's Making the Band 2 reality series.

Career 
During the preliminary period, 40,000 participants auditioned for a place in the group but Diddy narrowed it down to six artists. For several weeks the group was subjected to vigorous and sometimes demeaning tasks, including walking from midtown Manhattan to Brooklyn to purchase a Junior's cheesecake for Diddy, and Ness's battle with the Harlem rapper Jae Millz. Their first album, Too Hot for TV, was released in September 2003.

After Da Band 
On the season three finale, the group effectively ended when Diddy dissolved them and chose to keep Ness and Babs. Though not chosen to be kept on the season three finale, Diddy later brought Chopper "Young City" back on the label. Ness and Babs were to be a duo and Chopper was to be a solo artist on Bad Boy South. Chopper eventually left the label and was followed by Babs some time later, leaving Ness the group's only member still signed to Bad Boy. Ness has worked as a songwriter for Diddy on albums such as  Press Play (2006). The group (minus Freddy P and Dylan, who was played by Chappelle and appeared via footage) parodied what they went through during the filming of Making the Band 2 on Dave Chappelle's sketch comedy show Chappelle's Show. The group members have since been working on solo projects and have maintained good relationships with each other.  Sara Rivers previously Sara Stokes has since been remarried to new husband Fashun Rivers and also now share a newborn together that goes by the moniker "Baby" Fashun. Sara is now very involved in her entrepreneurial endeavors with her company SaraFina Co. an apparel and skincare collection. Chopper and Ness were involved in a long-standing dispute but that seems to have been settled. According to Dylan in a 2014 interview, the group was talking about reuniting but Chopper is apparently not yet on board.

In 2022, it was revealed that Chopper was facing a felony sex trafficking charge in Las Vegas in an ongoing criminal investigation alleging that he used his large social media following to recruit women as prostitutes, according to police.

Band members 
 Sara Rivers (born June 1, 1977) – a Port Huron R&B singer
 Dylan Dilinjah (born Dylan John on February 8, 1980) – a Brooklyn reggae vocalist
 Chopper "Young City" (born Kevin Barnes on January 12, 1985) – a rapper from the 3rd Ward of Uptown New Orleans, Louisiana  (Chopper recorded under the alias of Rodney Hill in an attempt to avoid prosecution by the law.)
 Babs (born Lynese Wiley in 1979) – an MC from Brooklyn
 E. Ness (born Lloyd Mathis in 1977) – an MC & battle rapper from Philadelphia
 Freddy P (born Freddrick Watson on November 23, 1981) – a Liberty City, Miami, Florida MC

Discography

Studio albums

Singles

References

External links 
 
 Bad Boy's Da' Band at MTV

 
 
 
 

American hip hop groups
Reality show winners
Musical groups established in 2003
Musical groups disestablished in 2004
Bad Boy Records artists
Participants in American reality television series